The National Indigenous Music Awards 2020 are the 17th annual National Indigenous Music Awards.

The nominations were announced on 13 July 2020 and the awards ceremony was held on 8 August 2020 and broadcast on the National Indigenous Television and simulcast across the country on Facebook, Double J, NIRS, Twitter and YouTube.

Performers
Archie Roach
Thelma Plum
Miiesha
Midnight Oil - "Gadigal Land"
Neil Murray, Christine Anu, Mau Power, Jim Moginie and Rob Hirst - "My Island Home"

Hall of Fame inductee
 Ruby Hunter

Ruby Hunter was born in 1955, on the banks of the Murray River in South Australia, Hunter was a Ngarrindjeri, Kokatha and Pitjantjatjara woman. During her lifetime, Hunter cut several landmark records. Her song "Down City Streets" appeared on Archie Roach's debut Charcoal Lane from 1990, and in 1994, she became the first Indigenous woman to release a solo album with the ARIA Award-nominated Thoughts Within. A second album, Feeling Good was released in 2000. Hunter passed away in 2010.

Triple J Unearthed National Indigenous Winner

JK-47 is a rapper from Tweed Heads South, New South Wales. JK-47 is best known for his appearance on Nerve's 2019 single "Sunday Roast". He released the tracks "The Recipe" in May 2020 and "I Am Here (Trust Me)" in July 2020.

Archie Roach Foundation Award
The second Archie Roach Foundation Award for an emerging NT artist was awarded to Kee'Anh.

Awards
Artist of the Year

New Talent of the Year

Album of the Year

Film Clip of the Year

Song of the Year

Community Clip of the Year

Indigenous Language Award

References

2020 in Australian music
2020 music awards
National Indigenous Music Awards